The 2020 season was the Miami Dolphins' 51st in the National Football League, their 55th overall and their second under head coach Brian Flores.

This was the first season since the  2016 Season, that the Dolphins finished with a winning  season.

Despite being 2nd in their division, and having double digit wins, the Dolphins failed to make the playoffs due to  Indianapolis beating the Jaguars in the last week of the season.

The Dolphins ranked 6th in defense this season.

Season Summary

The Dolphins dedicated their 2020 season in memory of legendary Dolphins' head coach Don Shula, who died on May 4, 2020, at the age of 90, at his Indian Creek, Florida home. At both home and away games, the Dolphins wore patches bearing Shula's surname and the number 347, the number of Shula's all-time number of wins in his 32 years as an NFL head coach. Shula, the winningest coach in NFL history, served as Dolphins' head coach from 1970 to 1995 and had led the franchise to five Super Bowl appearances, winning back-to-back championships in 1972 and 1973. Famously, in 1972, Shula led the Dolphins to their first Super Bowl title, as well as the only perfect season by a team since the 1970 AFL-NFL merger.

The Dolphins improved on their 5–11 record from the previous season, following a Week 10 win over the Los Angeles Chargers. After beginning the season 1–3, the Dolphins established themselves as playoff contenders by winning five straight games and starting with a 6–3 record for the first time since 2001. They also started 8–4 for the first time since 2003. The team clinched their first winning season since 2016 after a Week 15 win over the Patriots, which eliminated the Pats from the playoffs for the first time since 2008. On December 26, the Dolphins clinched their first 10-win season since 2016 with a 26–25 victory over the Las Vegas Raiders.

A significant factor in Miami's dramatic improvement over their 2019 season of 5–11 was the story of their defense. In 2019, the Dolphins allowed more points than any other team in the NFL. In 2020, only five teams allowed fewer points-per-game than the Dolphins.

However, despite the improvements, the Dolphins were eliminated from playoff contention for the fourth consecutive year following a blowout loss to the Buffalo Bills and the Indianapolis Colts' victory over the Jacksonville Jaguars in Week 17, becoming the first team to miss the playoffs with 10+ wins since the 2015 Jets, which, coincidentally, were also led by Ryan Fitzpatrick. Despite their elimination from the playoffs, 5th-year cornerback Xavien Howard joined Antonio Cromartie as the only players since the 1970 merger to record at least 10 interceptions in a season, and was the most by a Dolphins player since Dick Westmoreland in 1967. The Dolphins also clinched the rights for the 3rd overall pick in the 2021 NFL Draft, which is one of the two first-round picks they received from trading Laremy Tunsil and Kenny Stills to the Houston Texans a season prior. The Dolphins had also finished the 2020 season by scoring a total of 404 points, which is their third highest-scoring total in a season in franchise history (the franchise's highest being 513 total points in 1984).

This season was also highlighted by the emergence of rookie quarterback Tua Tagovailoa, the 5th pick in the 2020 Draft, who was named the Dolphins' starter in Week 8, after the team began 3–3 under the leadership of Ryan Fitzpatrick. As the Dolphins' starting quarterback, he went 6–3 and also became the fifth rookie quarterback since the 1970 merger to win his first three starts.

Signings
The Dolphins signed former Dallas Cowboys cornerback Byron Jones, former Philadelphia Eagles running back Jordan Howard, and former New England Patriots linebacker Kyle Van Noy. The Dolphins also picked up San Francisco 49ers' RB Matt Breida in a trade for a fifth-round draft pick which later became Colton McKivitz.

Free agent signings

Draft

Draft trades
The Dolphins traded their second-round and fourth-round selections in the 2019 NFL Draft to the New Orleans Saints in exchange for their second-round and sixth-round selections in 2019, as well as their second-round selection in 2020.
The Dolphins traded safety Minkah Fitzpatrick, a fourth-round selection, and a seventh-round selection in the 2021 NFL Draft to the Pittsburgh Steelers in exchange for a first-round and fifth-round selection in 2020 as well as a sixth-round selection in 2021.
The Dolphins traded offensive tackle Laremy Tunsil, wide receiver Kenny Stills, a 2020 fourth-round selection, and a 2021 sixth-round selection to the Houston Texans in exchange for their 2020 first-round selection, as well as their first-round and second-round selections in the 2021 NFL Draft, offensive tackle Julién Davenport, and cornerback Johnson Bademosi.
The Dolphins traded a 2019 second-round selection, as well as their 2020 fifth-selection to the Arizona Cardinals in exchange for quarterback Josh Rosen. They regained this selection after trading running back Kenyan Drake to Arizona.
The Dolphins traded a seventh-round selection in the 2022 NFL Draft to the Los Angeles Rams in exchange for cornerback Aqib Talib and a fifth-round selection in the 2020 NFL Draft.
The Dolphins traded a sixth-round selection to the Indianapolis Colts in exchange for a conditional seventh-round selection and center Evan Boehm.
The Dolphins traded a seventh-round selection to the Minnesota Vikings in exchange for guard Danny Isidora.
The Dolphins traded safety Jordan Lucas to the Kansas City Chiefs in exchange for a seventh-round selection.
The Dolphins traded a seventh-round selection (251st) to the Seattle Seahawks in exchange for a 2021 sixth-round selection.

Staff

Final roster

Preseason
The Dolphins' preseason schedule was announced on May 7, but was later cancelled due to the COVID-19 pandemic.

Regular season

Schedule
The Dolphins' 2020 schedule was announced on May 7.

Note: Intra-division opponents are in bold text.

Game summaries

Week 1: at New England Patriots

This was the Patriots' first game without long-time quarterback Tom Brady since October 2, 2016, and their first without Brady on the roster since January 2, 2000. The 2020 season opener featured quarterback Cam Newton taking the reigns of the New England offense in his inaugural game as a member of the Patriots. Newton looked crisp in his first game in over a year as he scored twice on the ground in an offensive ground attack that compiled 217 yards rushing. Cam Newton scrambled for 75 yards on the ground and completed 15 of 19 passing, which left Miami's defense frustrated the entire day. Miami's offense struggled as well due to three interceptions thrown by veteran quarterback Ryan Fitzpatrick. Due to the COVID-19 pandemic, no fans were in the stands and fake crowd noise was piped onto the playing field. With the loss, the Dolphins fell to 0–1.

Week 2: vs. Buffalo Bills

Before play began, both teams stayed in their respective locker rooms for the playing of the national anthem. Miami, hoping to recover from their Week 1 loss, kept it close, but no cigar. Josh Allen, improving his offensive gamesmanship for a third NFL season, threw for a career-best 417 yards and four TDs extending the Bills’ winning streak to four-straight against the Fins. With 5:55 remaining in the 4th quarter and trailing 20-17, Allen threw a strike to the endzone for the score, after which, Buffalo never looked back. Buffalo's offense rolled over Miami for 524 total yards; 342 in the first half. At one point the Dolphins were poised to score from the Buffalo one-yard-line in the third quarter, but failed to connect on a 4th-down toss to the endzone. After the game, Dolphins’ head coach Brian Flores said. “You've got to finish in this league if you want to win." Nevertheless, Miami stayed in the game to the finish. Ryan Fitzapatrick completed 31 of 47 pass attempts, but it wasn't enough to overcome a Buffalo offense that had a banner day in South Florida. The Bills-Dolphins rivalry has undeniably been reignited. With the loss, the Dolphins fell to 0–2.

Week 3: at Jacksonville Jaguars

In this nationally-televised Thursday night match-up, a dominant Ryan Fitzpatrick-led offense scored touchdowns on its first three possessions, pummeling a Jacksonville Jaguars squad that had been a three point favorite at home. On the opposite side of the ball, Gardner Minshew threw two picks and zero TDs, settling the pre-game argument over whose facial hair made them a better QB. 
Minshew, who came into the game confident after two strong performances to start the 2020 season, looked uncomfortable all night as Miami's defense garnered two sacks and limited the Jaguars to only 13 total points. This was the Dolphins' first win over the Jaguars since 2014 and their first win by 10+ points since a 2017 win over the Denver Broncos. With the win, the Dolphins improved to 1–2.

Week 4: vs. Seattle Seahawks

On a hot day in south Florida, the Seahawks came in to Hard Rock Stadium unbeaten and left with an unblemished record of 4-0. The Fins were unable to stop Russell Wilson's air offensive allowing him 360 yards passing and two completions to the endzone. Miami's defense had no answers as the ‘Hawks continued their streak of scoring 30 points or more in every game this season. The Dolphins were able to score on their first five possessions, but all five trips into Seattle territory ended disappointingly with a field goal. Ryan Fitzpatrick might have had a solid performance (29 of 45 passing), but two interceptions ultimately resulted in a dispiriting home-field loss for his squad. This was the Seahawks' first road win over the Dolphins since 1996, when the Seahawks were part of the AFC West. With the loss, the Dolphins fell to 1–3.

Week 5: at San Francisco 49ers

The Miami Dolphins engineered a good old-fashioned beatdown as they imposed their will on the reigning NFC Champions in Levi's Stadium, California. Ryan Fitzpatrick was magic as he threw 22 of 28 for 350 yards including three touchdowns and no interceptions. Jimmy Garoppolo was hideous and was benched halfway through the game after putting up 7 of 17 passing for a measly 77 yards, no touchdowns and two interceptions. The Fins’ defense carved up the Niners’ offense all day, recovering a fumble, stealing two interceptions, forcing five sacks and allowing a third-down efficiency of only 20%. In this rematch of Super Bowl XIX, this was the Dolphins' first road win over the 49ers since 2004, also their first time since October 25, 2015 scoring over 40 points in a game, and their largest blowout win since December 3, 2017. With the win, the Dolphins improved to 2–3.

Week 6: vs. New York Jets

This was the Dolphins' first shutout win since November 2, 2014, when they defeated the San Diego Chargers 37–0. Jets quarterback Joe Flacco also lost to the Dolphins for the first time in his 12-year career. Rookie Tua Tagovailoa, the 5th overall pick in the 2020 Draft made his NFL debut during the final seconds of the game, where he relieved Ryan Fitzpatrick and completed 2 passes for 9 passing yards, also Tua's first game since November 16, 2019 when he suffered a season-ending hip injury as a member of the Alabama Crimson Tide. With the win, the Dolphins improved to 3–3.

Week 8: vs. Los Angeles Rams

This was rookie quarterback Tua Tagovailoa's first NFL start, with Ryan Fitzpatrick returning to his backup role for the first time since October 13, 2019. The Dolphins also defeated the Rams for the 5th time since 2001. The game was dominated by the Dolphins' defense, which forced the Rams into four first-half turnovers, and allowed the Dolphins to win with only 145 yards of total offense, the lowest yardage compiled by a winning team all season. During the 2nd quarter, linebacker Andrew Van Ginkel scored his first NFL touchdown on a 78-yard fumble recovery, the second-longest fumbled return in franchise history since Dolphins Hall of Famer Jason Taylor ran on an 85-yard fumble return in 2005. With the win, the Dolphins improved to 4–3.

Week 9: at Arizona Cardinals

In a back-and-forth game, Miami pulled ahead late in the game with 10 points in the fourth quarter, taking the lead with a 50-yard field goal from Jason Sanders after the two-minute warning. Kyler Murray drove the Cardinals into field goal range in the final seconds, but kicker Zane Gonzalez missed the potential game-tying field goal short, sealing a 34–31 Miami victory. With the win, the Dolphins not only improved to 5–3 for the first time since 2014, but also earned their first 4-game winning streak since 2016 and a win in Phoenix for the first time since 1996.

Week 10: vs. Los Angeles Chargers

In a compelling battle between rookie quarterbacks, Miami's Tua Tagovailoa (2020 draft #5 overall) was the victor over Justin Herbert (2020 draft #6 overall). Miami quickly leapt to a 14-0 advantage forcing Herbert & company into struggling after the Dolphins for the entire game. Despite throwing two touchdowns, Herbert also tossed an interception forced by a Miami defense that hounded him all day. Tagovailoa threw for two scores and zero interceptions which culminated in his third-straight victory as a rookie QB. By defeating the Chargers, the Fins have won five straight games. The Dolphins began the season 6–3 for the first time since 2001. Tua Tagovailoa also became the 5th rookie quarterback since the 1970 AFL-NFL merger to begin 3–0, after Ben Roethlisberger, Mark Sanchez, Carson Wentz, and Lamar Jackson.

Week 11: at Denver Broncos

The Dolphins played without running back Jordan Howard as he got cut on November 16, 2020, after just nine games with the Dolphins. In the fourth quarter, Tua was replaced by Fitzpatrick after Tua got hurt. Fitzpatrick attempted a comeback but threw an interception in the red-zone ending any chances of a comeback and dropping the Dolphins 6–4. Not only did the Dolphins fail to win in Denver for the first time since 2008, but Tua failed to join Ben Roethlisberger as the only rookie quarterbacks to begin 4–0.

Week 12: at New York Jets

Veteran quarterback Ryan Fitzpatrick made his first start since Week 6, as rookie Tua Tagovailoa was ruled out after suffering a minor injury during practices. Wide receiver DeVante Parker became the 9th player in franchise history to reach 4,000 career receiving yards, and the Dolphins swept the Jets for the first time in two seasons. This was also Fitzpatrick's final full game of his career, as he retired from the NFL 2 years later on June 2, 2022. With the win, the Dolphins improved to 7–4.

Week 13: vs. Cincinnati Bengals

For the first time since suffering a minor thumb injury, Tua Tagovailoa returned as the Dolphins' starting quarterback. The Bengals jumped out to an early lead of 7-0, but were unable to add to that score for the rest of the contest. Officials were kept busy maintaining order in this game that came to blows between players and culminated in entire teams storming the field to face off with one another. After players were finished trading blows and referees were finished ejecting five of them from the contest, Brian Flores’ Miami Dolphins emerged victorious in arguably the best performance, thus far, of Tua Tagovailoa's nascent career by going 26 of 39 for 296 passing yards, one TD and no interceptions. The Fins continued their domination of other teams by allowing only seven points maintaining a hold on second overall in the NFL in scoring defense. The Dolphins began 8–4 for the first time since 2003 and also clinched a non-losing season for the first time since 2016.

Week 14: vs. Kansas City Chiefs

Despite holding a 10–0 lead during the first quarter and attempting a comeback down 30–10 in the 4th quarter, the Dolphins not only failed to beat the Chiefs for the first time since 2011, but they also failed to beat them at home for the first time since 2006, and to beat an Andy Reid-coached team for the first time since 1999, which was Reid's first year coaching the Philadelphia Eagles. With the loss, the Dolphins fell to 8–5.

Week 15: vs. New England Patriots

Not only did the Dolphins clinch their first winning season since 2016, but they defeated the Patriots at home for the first time since the Miracle in Miami, and defeated a Cam Newton-led team for the first time in franchise history. The Dolphins also eliminated the Patriots from postseason contention for the first time since 2008, and ensured their first non-winning season since 2000. Quarterback Tua Tagovailoa became the 6th rookie quarterback to defeat Bill Belichick's Patriots, after Ben Roethlisberger, Mark Sanchez, Colt McCoy, Russell Wilson, and Geno Smith. Backup quarterback Ryan Fitzpatrick also finished with a winning record in his career for the first time since 2015, when he played for the New York Jets, and for only the second time in his 15-year career. With the win, the Dolphins improved to 9–5.

Week 16: at Las Vegas Raiders

Despite not holding a lead for much of the game and not scoring a touchdown in the first half, the Dolphins defeated the Raiders in a last-minute field goal made by Jason Sanders. Backup quarterback Ryan Fitzpatrick relieved a struggling Tua Tagovailoa in the 4th quarter and threw to Myles Gaskin for a touchdown to hand the Dolphins their first lead of the game, 23–22. After the Raiders retook the lead with only 23 seconds left in the fourth quarter, Fitzpatrick threw a no-look pass to Mack Hollins while his facemask was being tugged by a defender, a pass which Kansas City Chiefs' quarterback Patrick Mahomes dubbed "the greatest no-look pass of all time", to set up Sanders' game-winning field goal. This would also be Fitzpatrick's last appearance as a Dolphin, as he tested positive for COVID-19 5 days later, which caused him to miss the season finale versus the Buffalo Bills, and would sign with the Washington Football Team as a free agent on March 15, 2021, the 9th team he has played for in 16 years. With the win, the Dolphins improved to 10–5.

Week 17: at Buffalo Bills

After the embarrassing blowout loss, the Dolphins failed to win 11 games in a season for the 12th consecutive year, when the 2008 Miami Dolphins won 11 games. After the Indianapolis Colts defeated the Jacksonville Jaguars the same day, the Dolphins were eliminated from postseason contention for the 4th consecutive season. The Dolphins had also failed to become the first team since the 1999 Washington Redskins to clinch both a playoff berth and a top-3 pick in the upcoming draft, which is the first-round pick they acquired from trading Laremy Tunsil and Kenny Stills to the Houston Texans the season prior. With the loss, the Dolphins finished the 2020 season at 10–6.

Standings

Division

Conference

References

External links
 

Miami
Miami Dolphins seasons
Miami Dolphins